Chris Sheridan is a Canadian filmmaker and co-founder, with wife Patty Kim, of Safari Media. With his wife he co-directed the 2006 documentary Abduction: The Megumi Yokota Story and the 2004 documentary Destiny, which won a top award at the New York International Independent Video and Film Festival. He now lives and works in Washington, D.C., USA with his wife.

External links
Safari Media homepage

Living people
Year of birth missing (living people)
Place of birth missing (living people)
Canadian documentary film directors